Okenia pilosa is a species of sea slug, specifically a dorid nudibranch, a marine gastropod mollusc in the family Goniodorididae.

Distribution
This species was described from New Caledonia. It is known from Hong Kong, Papua New Guinea and Heron Island (Queensland), Australia.

Description
This Okenia has a broad body and many irregularly arranged papillae. The body is translucent and has some spots of dark brown surrounded by pale brown pigment.

Ecology
The diet of this species is a bryozoan, Calpensia sp..

References

Goniodorididae
Gastropods described in 1983